The Abbas El-Akkad Experimental Language School, school located at 1 Tahseen Fargali Street, Area 1, Nasr City, Cairo, Egypt.
It was named after the writer Abbas el-Akkad. It caters for children from kindergarten to secondary level.

References

Schools in Cairo